PT XL Axiata Tbk (formerly PT Excelcomindo Pratama Tbk), is an Indonesia-based mobile telecommunications services operator headquartered at Jakarta. It is the second largest mobile telecommunications company in Indonesia. The operator's coverage includes Java, Bali, and Lombok as well as the principal cities in and around Sumatra, Kalimantan and Sulawesi. XL offers data communication, broadband Internet, mobile communication and 3G services over GSM 900 and GSM 1800 networks.

Initially, XL provided cellular mobile telephony services using the GSM 900 technology. A few years after launching services, the company was awarded a license for implementing a DCS 1800 network, and to operate an ISP and VoIP service. In 2006, XL obtained a 3G license, which services launched in September of the same year.

At the end of 2010, the company had more than 22,000 BTS towers across Indonesia. XL is the second largest mobile network operator in Indonesia, with a subscriber's strength of 55.1 million users.

Shares of XL surged in May 2019, one day after Axiata Group announced talks with Norway's Telenor aimed at combining their Asian operations.

History
Excelcomindo was established on October 6, 1989 under the name of PT Grahametropolitan Lestari  and originally was a trading and general services company. XL became the first private mobile services operator in the country, starting commercial operations on October 8, 1996. In 2009, XL was bought by the Axiata Group which caused a change of logos. The XL letters were made blue (the blue and green version was also used), and an Axiata tag was added on to the logo. On October 28, 2014, XL launched the new logo with the launch of Real Mobile 4G LTE network service. On October 5, 2016, to commemorate XL's 20th anniversary, XL changed its logo colour from yellow and green to blue and green, similar to the colour in the first XL logo.

Slogans

Pro XL (1997–2004)
 Langsung Kriiiing.... (Directly Rings..., 8 October 1996 – 14 March 2002)
 Tak Selalu Pilihan Anda yang Pro  (Your Choice isn't Always the Pro, 1 January 1998 – 31 December 1999)
 Anda yang Pro (You're the Pro, 1 January 2000 – 15 November 2001)
 Pilih yang Pro (Choose the Pro, 31 December 1997 – 15 November 2001)
 Tak Hanya Bicara (Not Just Talkin', 16 November 2001 – 25 June 2004)
 Bening Sepanjang Nusantara (Calling Throughout the Archipelago, 21 June 2003 – 25 June 2004)

XL (2004–present)
 Makin Akrab, Makin Bersahabat (The More Familiar, The Friendlier, 25 June 2004 – 30 September 2004)
 Membuat Dunia Extra Small (Makes the World Extra Small, 1 October 2004 – 31 May 2006)
 Life Unlimited (1 June 2006 – 31 May 2007)
 Jangkauan Luas (Wide Reach, 1 June 2007 – 30 September 2008)
 Nyambung Teruuus (Keeeep Connecting, 1 October 2008 – 31 May 2009)
 Jaringan Handal (The Reliable Network, 1 June 2009 – 11 August 2010)
 XLalu Untukmu (Always for You, 11 August 2010 – 30 September 2010)
 XLalu Bersamamu (Always with You, 1 October 2010 – 31 December 2010)
 XLalu Lebih Baik (Always Better, 1 January 2011 – 31 October 2011)
 XLangkah Lebih Maju (One Step Ahead, 1 November 2011 – 31 January 2013)
 Internet Tercepat (The Fastest Internet, 1 February 2013 – 27 October 2014)
 Sekarang, Bisa! (Now, You Can!, 28 October 2014 – 4 April 2018)
 Karena XL Bisa! (Because XL Can!, 5 April 2018 – 23 November 2020)
 #XtraBisa (#ExtraCapable, 24 November 2020 – present)
 Ini Cara Kita (This is Our Way, 1 April 2021 – 26 February 2022)
 We Are More (26 February 2022 – present)

High-bandwidth fibre-optic cable
Telekom Malaysia, Mora Telematika and XL Axiata has been working cooperatively to build a high-bandwidth fibre-optic submarine cable, which will stretch  400 kilometers, between the state of Malacca and Batam, through Dumai, with a total cost of  $7.6 million USD.
Led by Huawei Marine Networks, the cables were completed on Q4 2011.

XL Axiata, in partnership with Nextgen Group and 3 other partners, built the Australia-Singapore Cable to connect Australia, Indonesia and Singapore. XL Axiata has a submarine beach cable facility and submarine cable landing station in Anyer, Banten to connect the Australia-Singapore Cable to Indonesia.

References

External links 
 Official site

Axiata
2005 initial public offerings
Companies listed on the Indonesia Stock Exchange
Indonesian brands
Indonesian companies established in 1989
Mobile phone companies of Indonesia
Satellite operators
Telecommunications companies established in 1989
Telecommunications companies of Indonesia